Peter Sincock (born 8 July 1948) is an Australian cricketer. He played in five first-class matches for South Australia in 1974/75.

See also
 List of South Australian representative cricketers

References

External links
 

1948 births
Living people
Australian cricketers
South Australia cricketers
Cricketers from Adelaide